Tortula paulsenii is a leaf moss species described by Viktor Ferdinand Brotherus in 1906. Tortula paulsenii is included in the Pottiaceae family. No subspecies are listed in Catalog of Life.

References

Plants described in 1906
Pottiaceae
Taxa described in 1906